Pterocymbium is a genus in the family Malvaceae: in the subfamily Sterculioideae and previously placed in the Sterculiaceae.  In Indonesia, P. tinctorium (Kelumbuk) is a significant timber tree.

Species 
Plants of the World Online currently (2019) lists the following accepted species:
 Pterocymbium beccarii K.Schum. - New Guinea
 Pterocymbium dongnaiense Pierre - Laos and Vietnam§
 Pterocymbium dussaudii Tardieu - Laos
 Pterocymbium macranthum Kosterm. - Thailand and Myanmar
 Pterocymbium micranthum Mildbr. - Bismarck Archipelago
 Pterocymbium oceanicum A.C.Sm. - Fiji
 Pterocymbium parviflorum Merr. - Borneo
 Pterocymbium splendens Kosterm. - Borneo
 Pterocymbium stipitatum C.T.White & W.D.Francis n- New Guinea
 Pterocymbium tinctorium (Blanco) Merr. – Indo-China, Malesia (including Philippines)
 Pterocymbium tubulatum (Mast.) Pierre – Peninsular Malaysia
 Pterocymbium viridiflorum Teijsm. & Binn. ex Koord. - Sulawesi

§ In Viet Nam the name for this genus is Dực nang with two species listed:
 P. dongnaiense  Pierre: Dực nang Ðồng nai
 P. tinctorium (Blanco) Merr.: Dực nang nhuộm
Both are deciduous trees, approximately 25 m high, found in tropical forests.

References

External links
 
 POWO: Pterocymbium

Malvaceae genera
Sterculioideae